Magnesium formate is a magnesium salt of formic acid. It is an inorganic compound. It consists of a magnesium cation and formate anion. It can be prepared by reacting magnesium oxide with formic acid. The dihydrate is formed when crystallizing from the solution. The dihydrate dehydrates at 105 °C to form anhydrate, then decomposes at 500 °C to produce magnesium oxide. Magnesium formate can be used for organic syntheses.

References

Formates
Magnesium compounds